Vahan Malezian (in Sulina, Romania - 1966 in Nice, France) was an Armenian writer, translator, poet, and social activist.

References 

People from Sulina
1871 births
1966 deaths
Romanian people of Armenian descent
19th-century male writers
20th-century male writers
Date of death missing
Romanian emigrants to France
Romanian expatriates in France
Romanian expatriates in Turkey
Romanian expatriates in Egypt
Romanian expatriates in Belgium
Romanian expatriates in the United States